The 1989 French motorcycle Grand Prix was the eleventh round of the 1989 Grand Prix motorcycle racing season. It took place on the weekend of 14–16 July 1989 at the Bugatti Circuit located in Le Mans.

500 cc race report
Eddie Lawson on pole. At the start, Wayne Rainey gets around Lawson, with Freddie Spencer in third, followed by Pierfrancesco Chili and Christian Sarron. Soon it’s the California duo with a small gap, and Kevin Schwantz has made up for his bad start by moving into third, with Kevin Magee in fourth.

Wayne Gardner crashes out, and Schwantz joins the fight for first, with back-marker traffic making life difficult for Lawson and Rainey.

Schwantz is braking very late and making it stick, and he and Lawson start to drop Rainey. Lawson manages to get past Schwantz on the start-finish straight, and though very few win a last lap battle with Schwantz, Lawson manages it, putting Schwantz in a crucial second place to extract maximum points from Rainey in third.

500 cc classification

References

French motorcycle Grand Prix
French
Motorcycle Grand Prix